The Surprise 25, often just called the Surprise, is a French trailerable sailboat, that was designed by Michel Joubert of Joubert Nivelt Design as a one-design racer and first built in 1977.

The Surprise 25 was followed in production by the larger  Grand Surprise in 1999.

Production
The design was built by Archambault Boats of Dangé-Saint-Romain and also by the BG Race shipyard in Saint-Malo in France between 1977 and 2017, with 1,550 boats completed, but it is now out of production. Archambault, which had been founded in 1967, went out of business in 2015. The BG Race shipyard, founded in 2013, built many designs for Archambault and went out of business in 2017.

Design
The Surprise 25 is a recreational keelboat, built predominantly of fibreglass. The hull is solid fibreglass and the deck is balsa-cored fibreglass. It has a 7/8 fractional sloop  rig with aluminum spars, a deck-stepped mast, wire standing rigging and a single set of swept spreaders. The hull has a raked stem, a slightly reverse transom with an inset, an internally mounted spade-type rudder controlled by a tiller with a "D"-handle extension. It was delivered with a choice of a fixed fin keel, twin asymmetrical keels with bulb weights, or a swing keel. It displaces  and carries  of cast iron ballast.

The design has sleeping accommodation for four people, with a "V"-berth in the bow cabin and two straight settees in the main cabin.

Operational history
The boat is supported by an active class club that organizes racing events, the Aspro Surprise (Association Des Propriétaires Surprise, English:Surprise Owners Association).

See also
List of sailing boat types

References

External links

Photo of a Surprise 25 with twin keels

Keelboats
1970s sailboat type designs
Sailing yachts
Trailer sailers
Sailboat type designs by Joubert-Nivelt
Sailboat types built by Archambault Boats
Sailboat types built by BG Race